Jon Jonsson, Jon Jönsson, or Jón Jónsson may refer to:

Jon Jönsson (born 1983), Swedish footballer
Jon Jonsson (model) (born 1982), Icelandic model, winner of 2004 TV series Manhunt
Jón Jónsson (born 1985), Icelandic singer, songwriter, and footballer
Jón Jónsson (water polo) (1908-1973), Icelandic water polo player

See also
Jon Jonsson i Källeräng (1867–1939), Swedish politician
Jón Sveinbjørn Jónsson (1955–2008), Icelandic/Norwegian poet, children's writer, and translator
John Jonsson, mayor of Dallas, Texas
Jonathan Johnson (disambiguation)
John Johnson (disambiguation)